Taiga is the fourth studio album by American singer-songwriter Zola Jesus. It was released on October 6, 2014 in the UK and EU and on October 7, 2014 in the US through Mute. The album was produced by Nika Roza Danilova and co-produced by Dean Hurley. It marks the first Zola Jesus record to be released through Mute Records. The album title Taiga is the Russian word for boreal forests. A music video was released for the album's first single "Dangerous Days". The music video was directed by  Timothy Saccenti and filmed in Hoh Rainforest, Washington.

Critical reception

Upon its release, Taiga received generally positive reviews from music critics. The review aggregator website Metacritic assigns a "Metascore" to each album, which is based on the ratings and reviews of selected mainstream independent publications, and the release has a score of a 66 based on 21 selected critics, indicating "generally favorable reviews".

Track listing

Personnel
Credits adapted from liner notes.

Zola Jesus
 Nika Roza Danilova – vocals, synthesizer, programming, production, arrangement

Additional musicians
 Joe Exley – horn arrangement, tuba
 Kyra Sims – French horn
 Gabe Martin – flugelhorn, trumpet
 Garth Flowers – trumpet
 Andris Mattson – trumpet
 Erik Hughes – trombone
 Matt Melore – trombone
 James Rogers – trombone
 Drake Smith – trombone
 Kim Free – violin
 Gillian Rivers – violin
 Yuiko Kamakari – viola
 Justin Kantor – cello

Technical personnel
 Dean Hurley – production, engineering, mixing
 Chris Coady – additional production
 Brian Rosemeyer – additional engineering
 David Tolomei – additional engineering
 Blake Mares – mixing assistance
 Brian Lucey – mastering
 Caleb Braaten – art direction, design
 David Correll – art direction, design
 Julia Comita – cover, insert photography
 Jeff Elstone – back cover photography

Charts

References

External links
 

2014 albums
Zola Jesus albums
Mute Records albums
Albums recorded at Kingsize Soundlabs